Lady Grooms (born September 12, 1970) is an American former professional basketball player, who was one of the 16 original WNBA players allocated to the teams in the new league's Initial Player Allocation draft (as Lady Hardmon).  After a college career at the University of Georgia, she played 8 WNBA seasons and had career averages of 4.6 points and 2.1 rebounds per game, scoring over 1,000 career points and 500 career rebounds.

Georgia statistics
Source

WNBA career 
1997: Utah Starzz1998–2004: Sacramento Monarchs

Grooms currently is the Director of Basketball Operations and the Head girls basketball coach at Landmark Christian School in Fairburn, Georgia. Grooms was formerly the head coach of the girls basketball team at Greater Atlanta Christian in Norcross, Ga. Grooms previously coached the varsity girls basketball team at Arlington Christian School in Fairburn, Georgia.  In her first two seasons coaching the team, it won the state title each year in the GISA.  Grooms has won awards as state and regional coach of the year.

References

1970 births
Living people
American expatriate basketball people in Hungary
American expatriate basketball people in Italy
American expatriate basketball people in Turkey
American women's basketball players
Georgia Lady Bulldogs basketball players
High school basketball coaches in the United States
Utah Starzz players
Sacramento Monarchs players
Shooting guards
Sportspeople from Fulton County, Georgia
Place of birth missing (living people)
People from Fairburn, Georgia
American women's basketball coaches